Eberhard "Ebse" Vogel (born 8 April 1943) is a former German footballer.

Career
Vogel played for FC Karl-Marx-Stadt (1961–1970) and FC Carl Zeiss Jena (1970–1982). His 440 appearances for both clubs combined was the record for East German top-flight football.

On the national level, he played for the East Germany national team (74 matches/25 goals) and was a participant at the 1974 FIFA World Cup.

In 1969, Vogel won the award for the GDR Footballer of the Year.

In 1972, he scored the game-winning goal against rival West German national team in the 1972 Summer Olympics.

Vogel later began coaching career and led several teams, including 1. FC Magdeburg, Dresdner SC and Togo.

Career statistics

Club

Honours

Clubs
FC Karl-Marx-Stadt	
 DDR-Oberliga: 1966–67

Carl Zeiss Jena	
FDGB-Pokal: 1971–72, 1973–74, 1979–80

Individual
Footballer of the Year for East Germany: 1969

References

External links 
 
 

1943 births
Living people
People from Frankenberg, Saxony
Footballers from Saxony
German footballers
East German footballers
Olympic footballers of the United Team of Germany
Olympic footballers of East Germany
Olympic bronze medalists for the United Team of Germany
Olympic bronze medalists for East Germany
Olympic medalists in football
Footballers at the 1964 Summer Olympics
Footballers at the 1972 Summer Olympics
Medalists at the 1964 Summer Olympics
Medalists at the 1972 Summer Olympics
1974 FIFA World Cup players
Chemnitzer FC players
FC Carl Zeiss Jena players
East German football managers
German football managers
Hannover 96 managers
Dresdner SC managers
East Germany international footballers
1. FC Magdeburg managers
FC Carl Zeiss Jena managers
Togo national football team managers
DDR-Oberliga players
1998 African Cup of Nations managers
Association football forwards
German expatriate football managers
Expatriate football managers in Togo
German expatriate sportspeople in Togo